The World Ocean Database Project, or WOD, is a project established by the Intergovernmental Oceanographic Commission (IOC). The project leader is Sydney Levitus who is director of the International Council for Science (ICSU) World Data Center (WDC) for Oceanography, Silver Spring. In recognition of the success of the IOC Global Oceanographic Data Archaeological and Rescue Project (GODAR project), a proposal was presented at the 16th Session of the Committee on International Oceanographic Data and Information Exchange (IODE), which was held in Lisbon, Portugal, in October–November 2000, to establish the World Ocean Database Project. This project is intended to stimulate international exchange of modern oceanographic data and encourage the development of regional oceanographic databases as well as the implementation of regional quality control procedures. This new Project was endorsed by the IODE at the conclusion of the Portugal meeting, and the IOC subsequently approved this project in June 2001.

The World Ocean Database represents the world’s largest collection of ocean profile-plankton data available internationally without restriction. Data comes from the: (a) Sixty-five National Oceanographic Data Centers and nine Designated National Agencies (DNAs) (in Croatia, Finland, Georgia, Malaysia, Romania, Senegal, Sweden, Tanzania, and Ukraine), (b) International Ocean Observing Projects such as the completed World Ocean Circulation Experiment (WOCE) and Joint Global Ocean Flux Study (JGOFS), as well as currently active programs such as CLIVAR and Argo, (c) International Ocean Data Management Projects such as the IOC/IODE Global Oceanographic Data Archaeology and Rescue Project (GODAR), and (d) Real-time Ocean Observing Systems such as the IOC/IODE Global Temperature-Salinity Profile Project (GTSPP). All ocean data acquired by WDC Silver Spring – USA are considered as part of the WDC archive and are freely available as public domain data.

Comparison of World Ocean Databases
The World Ocean Database was first released in 1994 and updates have been released approximately every four years, 1998, 2001, and 2005. The most recent World Ocean Database series, WOD09, was released in September 2009. The WOD09 has more than 9 million temperature profiles and 3.6 million salinity profiles. The table shows a comparison of the number of stations by instrument type in WOD09 with previous NODC/WDC global ocean databases.

Instrument Types

Ocean profile, plankton data, and metadata are available in the World Ocean Database for
29 depth-dependent variables (physical and biochemical) and 11 instruments types: Ocean Station Data (OSD), Mechanical Bathythermograph (MBT), Expendable Bathythermograph (XBT), Conductivity, Temperature, Depth (CTD), Undulating Oceanographic Recorder (UOR), Profiling Float (PFL), Moored Buoy (MRB), Drifting Buoy (DRB), Gliders (GLD), Autonomous Pinniped Bathythermograph (APB).

Word Ocean Database Products

The data in the World Ocean Database are made available through the online search and retrieval system known as WODselect. The World Ocean Atlas (WOAselect) series is a set of gridded (1° grid), climatological, objectively analyzed fields  of the variables in the World Ocean Database. The WOAselect is a selection tool by which the user can designate a geographic area, depth, and oceanographic variable to view climatological means or related statistics for a given variable at the requested depth for the requested geographic area.

See also 

 Geochemical Ocean Sections Study (GEOSECS)
 Global Ocean Data Analysis Project (GLODAP)
 Ocean heat content
 World Ocean Atlas (WOA)
 World Ocean Circulation Experiment (WOCE)

References

External links
 GODAR project and the World Ocean Database Project
 International Council for Science (ICSU)
 International Oceanographic Data and Information Exchange (IODE)
 NODC Ocean Climate Laboratory datasets and products
 World Data Center system
 World Ocean Atlas 2009 (WOA09)
 World Ocean Database 2009 (WOD09)
 World Ocean Database Select (WODselect) 

Oceanography
Scientific databases
World Ocean